Pieve Santo Stefano is a comune (municipality) in the Province of Arezzo in the Italian region Tuscany, located about  east of Florence and about  northeast of Arezzo.

Pieve Santo Stefano borders the following municipalities: Anghiari, Badia Tedalda, Caprese Michelangelo, Chiusi della Verna, Sansepolcro, Verghereto.

Main sights 

Hermitage of Madonna del Faggio, located in Cercetole. It was built in the 15th  century at the place where, according to tradition, the Virgin appeared to a shepherd in 1400.

References

External links

 Official website

Cities and towns in Tuscany